Roddy Alfredo Pérez Valerio (October 20, 1982. Santo Domingo, Dominican Republic), known professionally as Roddy Pérez is a film and music producer, director, actor and scriptwriter. He is the first Dominican in the history selected to the Berlinale Talents of the Berlin Film Festival, Germany. He is the founder and creator of Videoclip Awards and Dominican Film Market, officially the first film market in the history of the Caribbean Region Film Industry. He won the Press Award in the Dominican Film Festival New York in 2021, and received an Audience Award in the Dominican Film Festival in 2019. He won in 2007 as the Iberoamerican Film Producer of The Year in the Morelia Lab of the Morelia International Film Festival (FICM).

In 2019, Roddy Pérez premiered his first feature film, Héroes de Junio. After ten years of development and investigation, Héroes de Junio became the first Dominican belic feature film with the participation of Cheddy García, Javier Grullón, Fausto Rojas, Claudette Lalí, Mario Peguero, Maurizio Alberino and Vlad Sosa, along with the support of Programa Ibermedia.

In the music industry, as a producer and an artist, Roddy Pérez has three albums produced in his repertoire. Station Me is the latter. In 2021, Roddy Pérez wrote three books published in 2021 and 2022 "100 Excelencias del Cine Dominicano", "Dembow Mundial" and "Dembow Versus Hip Hop",  his first book.

Filmography

References 

 Diario Libre July, 2014.  http://www.diariolibre.com/cine/2014/07/31/i725521_celebrarn-primer-mercado-cinematogrfico-repblica-dominicana.html
 IMDb profile https://www.imdb.com/company/co0493578/
 https://filmfreeway.com/festival/DominicanFilmMarket
https://www.diariolibre.com/revista/cine/roddy-perez-group-con-seis-peliculas-para-el-2022-AJ30284499
https://www.berlinale-talents.de/bt/talent/roddya-perez/profile
https://listindiario.com/entretenimiento/2019/07/18/574462/roddy-perez-estrena-hoy-su-nueva-apuesta-al-cine?platform=hootsuite
https://www.diariolibre.com/videos/roddy-perez-director-del-filme-heroes-de-junio-la-historia-prohibida-FC13446210
https://www.elcaribe.com.do/sin-categoria/mas-200-videos-clips-estrenaron-este-ano/
https://hoy.com.do/los-heroes-de-junio-a-la-pantalla-grande/

External links 

 https://www.instagram.com/roddyperezoficial/
https://www.instagram.com/roddyperezgroup/
https://www.instagram.com/audiovisualdominicana/

Official Website 
 http://www.roddyperez.com

Living people
1982 births
Dominican Republic film directors
Dominican Republic male writers
Dominican Republic film producers
Dominican Republic people of French descent
Dominican Republic people of Italian descent
Dominican Republic people of Spanish descent
Dominican Republic people of Taíno descent